Michael Callan (born Martin Calinoff November 22, 1935 – October 10, 2022), sometimes known as Mickey Collins, was an American actor best known for originating the role of Riff in West Side Story on Broadway, and for his film roles for Columbia Pictures, notably Gidget Goes Hawaiian, The Interns and Cat Ballou.

Early life
Born Martin Calinoff in Chester, Pennsylvania to a Jewish family, Callan grew up in Philadelphia, where his father was a restaurateur. Callan described him as "the only Jewish businessman in Philly to have two Italian restaurants." Calllan began taking singing lessons at nine and dancing lessons at eleven. He appeared on the local show Horn and Hardardt's Children's Hour.

By the age of fifteen, he was dancing in local night clubs. Two years later, Callan moved to New York City and performed under the name of "Mickey Calin".

Broadway
Callan's first big break came when he was cast in The Boy Friend (1954) starring Julie Andrews, and Catch a St ar (1955). He and his dance partner, Grace Genteel, appeared on The Ed Sullivan Show and Chance of a Lifetime.

When he was 21, he auditioned for Jerome Robbins for the role of "Riff" in the original Broadway production of West Side Story (1957–59). He auditioned several times before getting the role over a period of a year, and he was almost taken out at the last minute because director Jerome Robbins felt he was "too good-looking" for the part. Robbins told him that he had to "be more hostile" and need to "concentrate on something to hate." Callan "concentrated on Jerry Robbins."

His performance in West Side Story was a great personal triumph. From October 1957 there were reports of studios interested in him.

Callan was seen by talent scout Joyce Selznick, who worked for Columbia Pictures. Columbia was on a "youth talent" drive at the time and signed Callan to a seven-year deal in June 1958. He had been using the name "Mickey Calin" but would use the name "Michael Callan". Selznick said Callan only wanted to sign a two-pictures-a-year contract, but she persuaded him that he would benefit from the extra exposure that studio would give him under a long-term deal.

Columbia Pictures

Columbia Pictures' first role for Callan was in a prestige production, They Came to Cordura (1959), starring Gary Cooper. Columbia then considered Callan for a number of projects, including The Mountain Road, by Theodore White, Parrish, and Let No Man Write My Epitaph. Callan's second film with Columbia was the lead role in The Flying Fontaines (1959).

In October 1959, Columbia Pictures announced that Callan was one of 11 young names the studio would be building up—the others were James Darren, (Darren's soon-to-be wife) Evy Norlund, Glenn Corbett, Carol Douglas, Jo Morrow, Margie Regan, Joby Baker, Rian Garrick, Joe Gallison, and Steve Baylor. He co-starred with Dick Clark and Tuesday Weld in Because They're Young (1960), and had a cameo in Pepe (1960).

Callan was unable to reprise his West Side Story role of Riff in the film version due to his contract with Columbia, but he did dance in the film Gidget Goes Hawaiian (1961), opposite Deborah Walley as Gidget and Darren as Moondoggie. He appeared in the fantasy adventure film, Mysterious Island (1961).

Callan was a juvenile delinquent threatening Alan Ladd in 13 West Street (1962), then was reunited with Walley in the family comedy, Bon Voyage! (1962) for Walt Disney. Back at Columbia, he appeared in a big hit, The Interns (1962), as one of four young doctors. Selznick said at the time "Mickey is very hot now".

Callan had a supporting role in The Victors (1963) and a bigger one in The New Interns (1964). In April 1964 Columbia said they had signed him to a new contract and would put him in King Rat. In June 1964 Columbia announced they had signed him to a six-picture contract.

Callan did not appear in King Rat. In 1964, he guest-starred in episodes of television series Twelve O'Clock High and Breaking Point. Around this time he released an album, My Home Town. After You Must Be Joking! (1965) Callan played the romantic lead in the Western comedy Cat Ballou (1965) opposite Jane Fonda. In August 1965, he signed a four-picture deal with Columbia and at one point was mentioned as a possible star for the space adventure Marooned (1969).

Television
After eight years and 13 films with Columbia, Callan landed the lead role of Peter Christopher on the NBC Television sitcom Occasional Wife made by Columbia's Screen Gems.

At the time, Callan was married to the former Carlyn Chapman. The young couple lived in Beverly Hills and had two daughters. He engaged in a 12-hour day filming schedule with weekends off for the production of the half-hour television series. Callan divorced Carlyn and was married for a time to Patricia Harty, the actress who played his "occasional wife" in the series.

In 1968, he co-starred as "Bill Calhoun" in the ABC-TV production of Cole Porter's Kiss Me, Kate starring Robert Goulet and Carol Lawrence.

Later career
Callan's later films included The Magnificent Seven Ride!, Lepke and The Cat and the Canary. His additional television credits include Breaking Point, Hazel, That Girl, The Name of the Game, The Mary Tyler Moore Show, Ironside, Marcus Welby, M.D., Griff, McMillan & Wife, Barnaby Jones, 12 O'Clock High, Quincy, M.E., Charlie's Angels, Simon & Simon, Fantasy Island, The Love Boat, The Bionic Woman, four episodes of Murder, She Wrote, and eight episodes of Love, American Style. He also played Hal B. Wallis in My Wicked, Wicked Ways: The Legend of Errol Flynn, and Metallo in Superboy.

Callan both produced and starred in his own film, Double Exposure (1982). He also returned, occasionally, to the stage in both straight plays and musicals including Absurd Person Singular, Killjoy, Love Letters, Hello Muddah, Hello Faddah, The Music Man, and George M!. Callan appeared in the Off-Broadway musical Bar Mitzvah Boy in 1987. His later credits included Stuck on You (2003) and The Still Life (2006). His TV credits also include Viper, shot in Canada, and 65 episodes of a cop show, Crosstown, as well as  ER.

Awards
Callan was nominated for a Golden Globe New Star of the Year Award in 1960 for The Flying Fontaines; and won in the same category the following year, for Because They're Young.

Personal life and death
Callan had two daughters, Dawn and Rebecca. He died of pneumonia on October 10, 2022, at the Motion Picture & Television Country House and Hospital in Woodland Hills, California, at the age of 86.

Partial filmography
Sources

 They Came to Cordura (1959) – Pvt. Andrew Hetherington
 The Flying Fontaines (1959) – Rick Rias
 Because They're Young (1960) – Griff Rimer
 Pepe (1960) – Dancer
 Gidget Goes Hawaiian (1961) – Eddie Horner
 Mysterious Island (1961) – Herbert Brown
 13 West Street (1962) – Chuck Landry
 Bon Voyage! (1962) – Nick O'Mara
 The Interns (1962) – Dr. Alec Considine
 The Victors (1963) – Eldridge
 The New Interns (1964) – Dr. Alec Considine
 Cat Ballou (1965) – Clay Boone
 You Must Be Joking! (1965) – Lieutenant Tim Morton
 The Magnificent Seven Ride! (1972) – Noah Forbes
 Frasier, the Sensuous Lion (1973) – Marvin Feldman
 The Photographer (1974) – Adrian Wilde
 Lepke (1975) – Robert Kane
 The Bionic Woman (1977, TV series) – John Bernard
 Record City (1978) – Eddie
 The Cat and the Canary (1979) – Paul Jones
 Double Exposure (1982) – Adrian Wilde
 Chained Heat (1983) – Martin
 Freeway (1988) – Lt. Boyle
 Leprechaun 3 (1995) – Mitch
 Drifting School (1995) – Andrew Morgan
 The Last Road (1997)
 Stuck on You (2003) – Fox Prexy
 The Still Life (2006) – Resident

Theatre Credits
The Boyfriend
West Side Story
Promises, Promises (1972)
Anything Goes (1972)
Hello Muddah Hello Father (1997) - producer

References

External links

 
 
 

1935 births
2022 deaths
American male film actors
American male stage actors
American male television actors
Columbia Pictures contract players
Deaths from pneumonia in California
Male actors from Philadelphia
New Star of the Year (Actor) Golden Globe winners